Scary Hours 2 is the fourth extended play by Canadian rapper Drake and a sequel to his second extended play Scary Hours (2018). It was released on March 5, 2021, and features two collaborations with American rappers Lil Baby and Rick Ross. The lead single, "What's Next", was released alongside the EP with an accompanying music video.

Background
In January 2021, Drake announced that his upcoming sixth studio album Certified Lover Boy would be delayed until later in 2021. Two months later, Scary Hours 2 was announced a day prior to release on Drake's social media platforms.

Commercial performance
The multi-single managed to chart on three charts, the Austrian, Italian, and German album charts, at number 10, 54 and 80, respectively.

"What's Next" debuted atop the US Billboard Hot 100 on the chart dated March 20, 2021, becoming his eighth song to top the chart. The remaining tracks from the EP, "Wants and Needs" and "Lemon Pepper Freestyle", managed to debut at number two and three, respectively, thus making him the first artist in history to have three songs debut in the top 3 of the Billboard Hot 100.

Track listing

Notes
  signifies a co-producer
  signifies an additional producer

Sample credits
 "Lemon Pepper Freestyle" contains a sample from "Pressure", written by Cecilie Maja and Robin Hannibal, as performed by Quadron.

Credits and personnel
 Drake – vocals
 Lil Baby – vocals 
 Rick Ross – vocals 
 40 – mixing
 Noel Cadastre – record engineering
 Chris Athens – mastering

Charts

References

2021 EPs
Drake (musician) EPs
Sequel albums